Guzmania melinonis is a species of plant in the genus Guzmania. This species is native to Bolivia, Peru, Colombia, the Guianas, Venezuela, Amazonas State of Brazil, and Ecuador.

References

melinonis
Flora of South America
Plants described in 1885